Surrey 1 is a level 9 English Rugby Union League. It is made up of teams predominantly from Surrey and south-west London. Teams play home and away matches from September through to April. Promoted teams move up to London 3 South West with the league winners going straight up and the runners up playing against the runners up from Hampshire Premier. Relegated teams drop to Surrey 2.

Each year some of the clubs in this division also take part in the RFU Junior Vase - a level 9-12 national competition.

Teams for 2021-22

The teams competing in 2021-22 achieved their places in the league based on performances in 2019–20, the 'previous season' column in the table below refers to that season not 2020–21.

Season 2020–21

On 30 October the RFU announced  that a decision had been taken to cancel Adult Competitive Leagues (National League 1 and below) for the 2020/21 season meaning Surrey 1 was not contested.

Teams for 2019-20

Teams for 2018-19

Teams for 2017-18

Teams for 2016-17
Chipstead
Law Society
Old Amplefordians (promoted from Surrey 2)
Old Emanuel 
Old Freemans
Old Georgians (promoted from Surrey 2)
Old Mid-Whitgiftian
Old Wellingtonians 
Old Whitgiftian
Old Wimbledonians
Purley John Fisher (relegated from London 3 South West)

Teams for 2015-16
Chipstead
Kingston
Law Society
Old Cranleighans
Old Emanuel (promoted from Surrey 2)
Old Freemans (promoted from Surrey 2)
Old Paulines
Old Wellingtonians 
Old Whitgiftian
Old Wimbledonians

Teams for 2014-15
Battersea Ironsides	
Camberley (relegated from London 3 South West)
Chipstead (promoted from Surrey 2)
Kingston	
Law Society (promoted from Surrey 2)
Old Cranleighans (relegated from London 3 South West)
Old Paulines
Old Wellingtonians (relegated from London 3 South West)
Old Whitgiftian
Old Wimbledonians

Teams for 2013-14
Battersea Ironsides
Kingston	
Old Blues
Old Freemens	
Old Paulines
Old Tiffinians
Old Tonbridgians
Old Walcountians
Old Whitgiftian
Old Wimbledonians

Teams for 2012-13
Cranleigh	
Croydon
Farnham	
Kingston	
Old Cranleighans
Old Freemens	
Old Tiffinians
Old Walcountians
Old Whitgiftian
Old Wimbledonians

Original teams
When league rugby began in 1987 this division contained the following teams:

Cranleigh
Dorking
Old Guildfordians
Old Blues
Old Cranleighans
Old Rutlishians
Old Surbitonians
Old Tiffinians
Old Wimbledonians
John Fisher Old Boys

Surrey 1 honours

Surrey 1 (1987–1993)

The original Surrey 1 was tier 8 league with promotion up to London 3 South West and relegation down to Surrey 2.

Surrey 1 (1993–1996)

The creation of National 5 South meant that Surrey 1 dropped from a tier 8 league to a tier 9 league for the years that National 5 South was active.  Promotion and relegation continued to London 3 South West and Surrey 2 respectively.

Surrey 1 (1996–2000)

The cancellation of National 5 South at the end of the 1995–96 season meant that Surrey 1 reverted to being a tier 8 league.  Promotion and relegation continued to London 3 South West and Surrey 2 respectively.

Surrey 1 (2000–2009)

The introduction of London 4 South West ahead of the 2000–01 season meant Surrey 1 dropped to become a tier 9 league with promotion to this new division.  Relegation continued to Surrey 2.

Surrey 1 (2009–present)

Surrey 1 remained a tier 9 league despite national restructuring by the RFU.  Promotion was to London 3 South West (formerly London 4 South West) and relegation to Surrey 2.

Promotion play-offs
Since the 2000–01 season there has been a play-off between the runners-up of Hampshire Premier and Surrey 1 for the third and final promotion place to London 3 South West. The team with the superior league record has home advantage in the tie.  At the end of the 2019–20 season the Surrey 1 teams have been the most successful with twelve wins to the Hampshire Premier teams seven; and the home team has won promotion on eleven occasions compared to the away teams eight.

Number of league titles

Cranleigh (2)
Farnham (2)
Old Guildfordians (2)
Old Wellingtonians (2)
Old Whitgiftian (2)
Reeds Weybridge (2)
Barnes (1)
Battersea Ironsides (1)
Chobham (1)
Cobham (1)
Dorking (1)
KCS Old Boys (1)
Kingston (1)
London Exiles (1)
London Irish Amateur (1)
Old Amplefordians (1)
Old Blues (1)
Old Cranleighans (1)
Old Emanuel (1)
Old Freemens (1)
Old Paulines (1)
Old Tiffinians (1)
Old Walcountians (1)
Old Wimbledonians (1)
Teddington (1)
Warlingham (1)
Wimbledon (1)

See also
London & SE Division RFU
Surrey RFU
English rugby union system
Rugby union in England

Notes

References

External links
Surrey Rugby Football Union

9
Rugby union in Surrey